Qinghai University for Nationalities is a university in Xining, Qinghai, China. It was established in December 1949 and was Qinghai's earliest university of higher education.

External links
Official website

For admission in Qinghai university contact below link: 
 http://www.studentsconsultant.com/index.php/universities/engineering-universities/174-qnu

Universities and colleges in Qinghai
Buildings and structures in Xining
Educational institutions established in 1949
1949 establishments in China
Minzu Universities